Sanghe Khalsa is a small village in Nurmahal.  Nurmahal is a sub-tehsil in the city Jalandhar of Indian state of Punjab.

STD code 
Sanghe Khalsa's STD code is 01826

References

Villages in Jalandhar district

Sanghe Khalsa 
ਸੰਘੇ ਖਾਲਸਾ 
History
The foundation of village sanghe Khalsa is laid by Chaudhary Daya Chand in 1704 Bikrami Samat and in English in 1647, Daya Chand Ji was from Surname Sanghe and they settled here from Khalsa Sanghe or Harimpur. It is 52 years before the establishment of Khalsa by Guru Gobind Singh. Then this village was known as Sanghe of Daya.
Daya Chand’s brother Matko Chand laid the foundation of village Sanghe Jagir. The village is on the other side of the main road. As the influence of Sikhism raised in area of Manjki Doaba under the establishment of Khalsa by Guru Gobind Singh, this village was given a new home Sanghe Khalsa.

Education
school

Pri Sanghe Khalsa
Address: Sanghe Khalsa, Numahal, Jalandhar, Punjab. PIN- 144044, Post- Sidhwan R.S.
Population
According to Census 2011 information the location code or village code of Sangha Khalsa village is 030072. The total geographical area of village is 176 hectares. Sangha Khalsa has a total population of 674 peoples of which 336 are males and 338 are females population. There are about 138 houses in Sangha Khalsa village. Nurmahal is nearest town to Sangha Khalsa.

Transport
Rail
The nearest railway station to Sanghe Khalsa is Nurmahal which is located in and around 6.0 kilometer distance. The following table shows other railway stations and its distance
Nakodar Jn railway station          6.5 KM.
Sansarpur railway station          20.0 KM.
Goraya railway station               22.3 KM.
Jalandhar Cantt railway station 24.5 KM.